Arisht Singhvi (born 31 May 1992, full name Arisht Sanjay Singhvi) is an Indian cricketer who plays for Rajasthan. He was born in Jodhpur, Rajasthan. He was brought by Delhi Daredevils for the 2013 Indian Premier League. He made his List A debut on 3 March 2014, for Rajasthan in the 2013–14 Vijay Hazare Trophy.

References

1992 births
Living people
Indian cricketers
Rajasthan cricketers